The Lindi sharp-snouted worm lizard (Ancylocranium barkeri), also known commonly as Barker's sharp-snouted worm lizard, is a species of amphisbaenian in the family Amphisbaenidae. The species is endemic to Tanzania. There are two recognized subspecies.

Etymology
The specific name, barkeri is in honor of New Zealander zoologist Ronald de la Bere Barker (1889–?).

Habitat

Diet
A. barkeri preys upon termites and other small invertebrates.

Reproduction
A. barkeri is oviparous. Clutch size is a single egg.

Subspecies
Two subspecies are recognized as being valid, including the nominotypical subspecies.
Ancylocranium barkeri barkeri 
Ancylocranium barkeri newalae

References

Further reading
Gans C (2005). "Checklist and Bibliography of the Amphisbaenia of the World". Bulletin of the American Museum of Natural History (289): 1–130. (Ancylocranium barkeri, p. 22).
Loveridge A (1946). "A New Worm-Lizard (Ancylocranium barkeri) from Tanganyika Territory". Proceedings of the Biological Society of Washington 59: 73–75. (Ancylocranium barkeri, new species).
Loveridge A (1962). "New Worm-Lizards (Ancylocranium and Amphisbaena) from Southeastern Tanganyika Territory". Breviora (163): 1–6. (Ancylocranium barkeri newalae, new subspecies, pp. 1–3).
Spawls S, Howell K, Hinkel H, Menegon M (2018). Field Guide to East African Reptiles, Second Edition. London: Bloomsbury Natural History. 624 pp. . (Ancylocranium barkeri, p. 323).

Ancylocranium
Reptiles described in 1946
Endemic fauna of Tanzania
Reptiles of Tanzania
Taxa named by Arthur Loveridge